The 2013 European Superstock 600 Championship was the ninth season of the European Superstock 600 Championship. Italian Franco Morbidelli was proclaimed champion after winning two races, he beat out fellow Italians Alessandro Nocco and Christian Gamarino to the title.

Race calendar and results

Championship standings

References

External links

European Superstock 600 Championship seasons
European Superstock 600 Championship
European Superstock 600 Championship